André-Jacques Marie (born 14 October 1925) is a French former hurdler who competed in the 1948 Summer Olympics.

References

1925 births
Living people
French male hurdlers
Olympic athletes of France
Athletes (track and field) at the 1948 Summer Olympics
European Athletics Championships medalists
21st-century French people
20th-century French people